The Xiao Wulai Waterfall or Little Wulai Waterfall is a waterfall in Fuxing District, Taoyuan, Taiwan. The height of the waterfall is around 55 meters. The waterfall is often confused with the Wulai Waterfall of New Taipei City.

Skywalk

Xiao Wulai Skywalk is suspended above the Xiao Wulai Waterfall. The walkway extended in the sky for 11 meters. Standing on the glass platform, 70 meters high above the bottom of waterfall, tourists can admire the scenery of waterfall.

References

Waterfalls of Taiwan
Geography of Taoyuan City